"If I Were a Carpenter" is a folk song written by Tim Hardin in the 1960s, and re-recorded with commercial success by various artists including Bobby Darin, The Four Tops and Johnny Cash. Hardin's own recording of the piece appeared on his 1967 album Tim Hardin 2. It was one of two songs from that release (the other being "Misty Roses") performed by Hardin at Woodstock in 1969. The song, believed by some to be about male romantic insecurity, is rumored to have been inspired by his love for actress Susan Morss, as well as the construction of Hardin's recording studio (in the home of Lenny Bruce).

Bobby Darin version

The first notable version of "If I Were a Carpenter" was released by Bobby Darin in October 1966. The song was produced by Charles Koppelman and Don Rubin at Darin's insistence. Darin played the acoustic guitar on the recording. Darin took some time to record the song in his recording session, and did not finish the recording until 7 o'clock in the morning. The song was released by  Atlantic Records, whose executives were reluctant to release the song until it received enthusiastic response by radio audience on the West Coast when Koppleman manage to get the song played there. 

The song became the biggest hit for Darin since his 1963 song "You're the Reason I'm Living", reaching No. 8 on the Billboard Hot 100. It also peaked at No. 9 in the UK. Darin's recording received a Grammy nomination for Best Contemporary Rock and Roll Solo Vocal Performance at the 9th Annual Grammy Awards, but lost to "Eleanor Rigby" by Paul McCartney.

The song is the title song of Bobby Darin's album If I Were a Carpenter, also produced by Koppelman and Rubin.

Charts

Four Tops version

In 1968, The Four Tops hit the Top 20 on both the pop and soul charts with their version. It also reached No. 7 in the UK charts in 1968 staying in the charts for 11 weeks.  It reached No. 4 in the Netherlands.

Personnel
 Lead vocals by Levi Stubbs
 Background vocals by Duke Fakir, Obie Benson and Lawrence Payton
 Additional background vocals by The Andantes
 Instrumentation by The Funk Brothers

Charts

Johnny Cash version 

In 1970, Johnny Cash and June Carter recorded a duet of the song, which went to No. 2 on the country chart and No. 36 on pop. Their recording won Cash and June a Grammy Award for Best Country Performance by a Duo or Group at the 1971 Grammy.

Charts

Robert Plant version

In 1993 former Led Zeppelin vocalist Robert Plant released a version on his studio album Fate of Nations. Plant's version reached  No. 63 on the UK Singles Chart.

Personnel
 Robert Plant – lead vocals
 Maartin Allcock – mandolin
 Chris Hughes – drums
 Phil Johnstone – harmonium
 Charlie Jones – bass guitar
 Kevin Scott MacMichael – guitar
 Lynton Naiff – string arrangement

Charts

Johnny Hallyday version (in French) 

French singer Johnny Hallyday covered the song in French in 1966. His version, titled "Si j'étais un charpentier", reached No. 3 in Wallonia (French Belgium).

Track listings
7-inch EP Philips 437.281 BE (1966)
 A1. "Si j'étais un charpentier" – 2:15
 A2. "On s'est trompé" – 2:40
 B1. "Je veux te graver dans ma vie" – 2:50
 B2. "La fille à qui je pense" – 2:57

Charts
 "Si j'étais un charpentier" / "Je veux te graver dans ma vie" / "La fille à qui je pense"

Other versions
 In 1969, Yugoslav band Crveni Koralji released a Serbo-Croatian version, entitled "Da sam drvosječa", on their EP Sam, the song becoming a nationwide hit for the band.
In 1972, a cover by Bob Seger reached No. 76 on the Billboard Hot 100. The single was released from his album Smokin' O.P.'s.
In 1974, Leon Russell released a version with a funk tempo and his own rewritten lyrics from the perspective of a "rock star". His single reached No. 73 on the Billboard Hot 100 and was included on his album Stop All That Jazz.
In 1982, Swanee released a version. It peaked at number 5 on the Kent Music Report and was the 33rd biggest selling single in Australia in 1981.

References

Songs about occupations
1966 songs
1966 singles
1968 singles
1970 singles
1972 singles
Songs written by Tim Hardin
Tim Hardin songs
Johnny Hallyday songs
Burl Ives songs
Bob Seger songs
Bobby Darin songs
Johnny Cash songs
June Carter Cash songs
Andy Kim songs
Four Tops songs
Leif Garrett songs
Song recordings produced by Brian Holland
Song recordings produced by Lamont Dozier
Philips Records singles
Motown singles
Atlantic Records singles
Columbia Records singles
Fontana Records singles